Stanislav Řezáč (born 29 April 1973) is a Czech long-distance cross-country skier competing in the Worldloppet Ski Federation series of races.

Řezáč won the prestigious Birkebeinerrennet race in Norway for four times - in 2002, 2005, 2008 and 2011. He also finished second-placed in the Vasaloppet race in Sweden in 2011. In 2009 he finished third in the same race.

Media 

In 2011 the video of Řezáč giving an interview after Birkebeinerrennet became viral in the Czech Republic. Řezáč was struggling to speak English, mixing it with German and Czech. During the interview, Řezáč mentions several times the word "šůšn". Journalists thought initially it is a misspelling of some English word. It was revealed later it refers to the Norwegian village of Sjusjøen.

Achievements 

 2000 Jizerská padesátka, Bedřichov, 50 km, Czech Republic, 1. place
 2001 Jizerská padesátka, Bedřichov, 50 km, Czech Republic 1. place
 2002 Kangaroo Hoppet, Falls Creek, Victoria (Australia), 1. place
 2003 Jizerská padesátka, Bedřichov, 50 km, Czech Republic 2. place
 2003 Vasaloppet, Sweden, 3. place
 2003 FIS Marathon Cup, 2. place
 2004 König Ludwig Lauf (Germany), 50 km classic, 1. place
 2004 Gatineau Loppet (Canada), 50 km classic, 1. place
 2004 American Birkebeiner (USA), 50 km classic, 2. place
 2004 FIS Marathon Cup,3. place
 2006 König Ludwig Lauf (Germany), 50 km classic, 1. place
 2006 Vasaloppet, Sweden, 4. place
 2009 Vasaloppet, Sweden, 3. place
 2010 Vasaloppet, Sweden, 3. place
 2011 Vasaloppet, Sweden, 2. place
 2011 Birkebeinerrennet, Norway, 1. place
 2011 World Classics Champion, 1. place
 2012 Jizerská padesátka, Bedřichov, 50 km, Czech Republic, 1. place
 2012 Marcialonga di Fiemme e Fassa 2012, 70 km classic, Italy, 3.place
 2012 Koenig Ludwig Lauf, 50 km, 1. place
 2012 Vasaloppet, Sweden, 3. place

References 

1973 births
Czech male cross-country skiers
Living people
Sportspeople from Jablonec nad Nisou